The Gorakhpur–Banaras Intercity Express is an Intercity train belonging to North Eastern Railway zone that runs between  and Banaras railway station in India. It is currently being operated with 15103/15104 train numbers on a daily basis.

Service

Route and halts 

The important halts of the train are:

Coach composition

The train consists of 18 coaches:

 2 × air-conditioned Chair Car
 6 × non-air-conditioned Chair Car
 8 × general unreserved coach
 2 × EOGs

Traction

Both trains are hauled by WAP-7 electric locomotive from Varanasi to Gorakhpur and vice versa.

See also 

 Gorakhpur Junction railway station
 Banaras railway station

Notes

References

External links 

 15103/Gorakhpur - Manduadih Intercity Express
 15104/Manduadih - Gorakhpur Intercity Express

Passenger trains originating from Varanasi
Passenger trains originating from Gorakhpur
Intercity Express (Indian Railways) trains